Ovejuela is a hamlet and alqueria located in the municipality of Pinofranqueado, in Cáceres province, Extremadura, Spain. As of 2020, it has a population of 73.

Geography 
Ovejuela is located 137km north of Cáceres, Spain.

References

Populated places in the Province of Cáceres